Sie Hian Ling (d.  1928), who sometimes signed his works H.L. Sie, was a Peranakan Chinese journalist from Semarang, Dutch East Indies (now Indonesia). He was one of the first Chinese journalists in the Indies and an early translator of Chinese novels.

Earlier in his career he worked for the Malay language newspaper Slompret Melajoe as well as Tamboer Melajoe, which he became editor of in around 1888. Apparently a Chinese editor was still unusual at that time as some Eurasian editors expressed unhappiness that the position had not been given to one of them, as was customary. The paper mostly reprinted news from overseas Chinese and European papers, and the paper did not do well and closed in 1889. After that he was also editor of other papers, such as Pembrita Semarang and later Bintang Semarang. In around 1899 or 1900 he founded his own paper Sinar Djawa (which after 1917 became a mouthpiece for the Communist Party of Indonesia).

In 1902 he was also made an official interpreter of Chinese at the Dutch court (Raad van Justitie) in Semarang and in this capacity, in 1904 he was made a Luitenant der Chinezen on an honorary basis by the Dutch East Indies government. He was also apparently a Christian, somewhat unusually for Peranakan Chinese at the time.

After 1910 he started writing fictionalized novels based on current events (a popular genre of literature among Chinese Indonesians at the time). In 1913 he sold his newspaper Sinar Djawa to the early Indonesian nationalist organization Sarekat Islam.

He died in Semarang in 1928.

References 

Kapitan Cina
Indonesian people of Chinese descent
Indonesian Hokkien people
Indonesian writers
People from Semarang
Indonesian newspaper editors
Newspaper editors from the Dutch East Indies
19th-century births
1920s deaths
Year of birth unknown
Year of death uncertain
Journalists from the Dutch East Indies